Five vessels of the British Royal Navy have borne the name Sophia:
  (also Speaker's Prize), of 300 tons (bm) and 26 guns, captured in 1652 and sold in 1657.
  of 145 tons (bm) and 12 guns that  captured in 1685 during the rebellion of Archibald Campbell, 9th Earl of Argyll, against King James. She became a fireship in 1688, a hoy in 1690, and was broken up in 1713.
 HMS Sophia was a vessel of 52 tons (bm) that the Royal Navy purchased in June 1804 for service as a fire vessel and then sold in 1807 after she had been laid up at Woolwich since her purchase.
 HMS Sophia, of 308 tons (bm), was one of over 20 vessels that the Royal Navy purchased in April 1809 for use in a fireship attack at the Battle of the Basque Roads and expended there.
  was a vessel of 150 tons (bm) that the Admiralty acquired on 5 November 1850 for use as a discovery vessel and then sold on 5 May 1853.

See also
 

Royal Navy ship names